Tomohiko Tomita (July 3, 1920 – November 13, 2003) was Grand Steward of the Imperial Household Agency (May 26, 1978 – June 14, 1988). He graduated from the University of Tokyo.

See also
Ministry of the Imperial Household

References

1920 births
2003 deaths
People from Hokkaido
University of Tokyo alumni